These are independent candidates in the 2013 Philippine House of Representatives elections:

Regions

2013 Philippine general election